BhanasHivara is a panchayat village in Nevasa tehsil of the Ahmednagar district in the Indian state of Maharashtra.
BhanasHivara is found under the Nevasa Vidhan Sabha constituency and the Shirdi Lok sabha constituency. The pincode of BhanasHivara is 414609. BhanasHivara is located on the Nevasa-Shevgaon district highway no. 44. The village is both side surrounded by the forest area of Nagapur and Mali-Chinchora.

Its nearest popular pilgrimages are Nevasa -Sant Dnyaneshwar temple, Devgad, Shani-Shingnapur.

History
The great Nizam’s commandant "Kavijung" established the BhanasHivara (भानसहिवरा) village in the work-period of Nizam Shahi dynasty at around 1350 AD.

Toponymy 
This ancient village has several traditional names. The first one 'Gadicha Hivara' and it refers to the Tomb of Kavijung Baba which is near the village and is about 500 years old, The second one and current 'BhanasHivara' come from the King "BHANAS" that ruled over the area and the village was his capital of that time.

Historic Locations 
One famous residence of the Emperor Kavijung was named as "Gadhi" and is situated in the heart of village. On the behalf of commandant Kavijung there is one 'Janab Kavijng Sahab Dargah Sharif' also present in the village and on the behalf of that there is always a village-fair in every year.

Demographics
The population of this village was about 12,443 on the year 2011. The majority of the population in BhanasHivara are Hindu along with Muslims and Christians. People of all communities live here. On recent years illegal Christian conversion largely happen from dalit people, which is changing demography of the village.

Economy
Most of peoples resident in this village are farmers, their primary crop is sugarcane in which they cultivate in large area.

Education
There is very old Gadge Maharaj Ashram Shala also located in village where there are hundreds of children's taking their education every year. There is also a Marathi medium, an Urdu medium and a Shriram high school that are present in the village, recently one polytechnic college have been founded in the village named as Sant Dnyaneshwar Polytechnic.

Temples
The very well-known and ancient ShriRam Mandir and 1008ParshwaNath Di-jain temple is located in the village.

See also
Villages in Nevasa taluka

References

Villages in Ahmednagar district